Della Robbia is a surname. Notable people with the surname include:

Luca della Robbia (1400–1481), Italian sculptor
Andrea della Robbia (1435–1525), Italian sculptor, nephew of Luca
Giovanni della Robbia (1469–1529), son of Andrea
Girolamo della Robbia (1488–1566), son of Andrea

See also
 Della Robbia Pottery (1894–1906), an English Arts and Crafts Movement pottery (inspired by the work of Luca della Robbia and his family)
 Della Robbia, American line of pottery produced by Roseville pottery
 Odd Della Robbia, a character in Code Lyoko
 Della Robbia (typeface), a typeface designed by Thomas Maitland Cleland